Men on the Sea Floor (Italian:Uomini sul fondo) is a 1941 Italian drama film directed by Francesco De Robertis. De Robertis specialised in semi-documentary films, in this case portraying the crew of an Italian submarine trapped after an accident. De Robertis's technique of using non-actors in roles has been credited as an influence on the development of Italian neorealism.

It was known as SOS Submarine.

Partial cast
 Felga Lauri   
 Diego Pozzetto
 Marichetta Stoppa

Release
The film was released in the US in 1948 with dubbed English.

Notable Curiosity 
The 1981 German submarine film Das Boot set in World War II also shares a suspenseful part with Men on the Sea Floor in which the German crew tries to free their disabled U-boat from the sea floor.

References

Bibliography 
 Moliterno, Gino. The A to Z of Italian Cinema. Scarecrow Press, 2009.

External links 
 

1941 films
1941 drama films
Italian drama films
1940s Italian-language films
Films directed by Francesco De Robertis
Films set in the Mediterranean Sea
World War II submarine films
Italian black-and-white films
1940s Italian films